Peter Raskopoulos (born 22 February 1962) is an Australian former association football player.

Playing career

Club career
Raskopoulos played his youth football for Earlwood Wanderers before being signed for Sydney Olympic for the first season of the National Soccer League in 1977.

International career
Raskopoulos made his debut in a B-International for Australia at the 1980 OFC Nations Cup. He captained Australia in his full international debut for Australia in August 1981 against Indonesia in Jakarta. He played his last match for the Socceroos in 1987 having played 14 matches, captaining the team twice.

Career after football
Peter took up the role of C.E.O at Sydney Olympic, his beloved club in 2001. At the helm, they won the NSL championship in 2001–02 season and won the minor premiership the following season. Today Peter Raskopoulos works as an operations & Public Relations Manager in Rasko Exporters and Consultants in Australia. He lives in Sydney with his wife and some of his children, including comedian Jordan.

References

1962 births
Living people
Australian soccer players
Australia international soccer players
National Soccer League (Australia) players
Marconi Stallions FC players
Sydney Olympic FC players
Greek emigrants to Australia
1980 Oceania Cup players
Association football midfielders
Footballers from Kastoria